Sholezard ( /ʃoʔleː zærd/) is an Iranian traditional saffron rice pudding dessert.

It is traditionally served on the occasion of festivals such as Ramazan. It is often vowed to cook it to achieve a wish, and when it is achieved, it is spread among others.

Ingredients
Sholezard is made of rice cooked with water and is flavored with saffron, sugar, rose water, butter, cinnamon and cardamom. It is typically decorated with cinnamon, almonds, rosebuds and pistachios.

See also
 Rice pudding
 Zarda (food)
 Zerde

References

External links

Iranian desserts